Straumporten is a -wide sound between the southernmost part, Migmatittodden of Phippsøya and northeast side, Gullberget of Parryøya, in Sjuøyane north of Nordaustlandet in Svalbard, Norway.

The sound was named because drift ice often passes through it with the tidal streams.

References

External links
Norwegian Polar Institute Place Names of Svalbard Database

Straits of Svalbard